Effingham is a city in Atchison County, Kansas, United States.  As of the 2020 census, the population of the city was 495.

History
The first post office in Effingham was established in 1868. Effingham experienced growth when the Central Branch Union Pacific Railroad was built through the neighborhood and by the 1880s was a thriving village. Effingham was named in honor of Effingham H. Nichols, an early promoter of the Central Branch Union Pacific Railroad.

Geography
Effingham is located at  (39.522774, -95.398633).

Demographics

2010 census
As of the census of 2010, there were 546 people, 217 households, and 141 families living in the city. The racial makeup of the city was 96.0% White, 1.6% African American, 0.9% Native American, 0.4% from other races, and 1.1% from two or more races. Hispanic or Latino of any race were 2.9% of the population.

There were 217 households, of which 35.0% had children under the age of 18 living with them, 51.6% were married couples living together, 10.1% had a female householder with no husband present, 3.2% had a male householder with no wife present, and 35.0% were non-families. 31.3% of all households were made up of individuals, and 15.7% had someone living alone who was 65 years of age or older. The average household size was 2.52 and the average family size was 3.23.

The median age in the city was 36.6 years. 30.2% of residents were under the age of 18; 5.2% were between the ages of 18 and 24; 26.4% were from 25 to 44; 19.7% were from 45 to 64; and 18.5% were 65 years of age or older. The gender makeup of the city was 49.3% male and 50.7% female.

2000 census
As of the census of 2000, there were 588 people, 236 households, and 155 families living in the city. The racial makeup of the city was 97.28% White, 0.34% African American, 1.36% Native American, 0.51% from other races, and 0.51% from two or more races. Hispanic or Latino of any race were 0.51% of the population.

There were 236 households, out of which 31.4% had children under the age of 18 living with them, 55.5% were married couples living together, 9.3% had a female householder with no husband present, and 34.3% were non-families. 30.9% of all households were made up of individuals, and 18.2% had someone living alone who was 65 years of age or older. The average household size was 2.49 and the average family size was 3.12.

In the city, the population was spread out, with 27.7% under the age of 18, 9.0% from 18 to 24, 21.9% from 25 to 44, 24.1% from 45 to 64, and 17.2% who were 65 years of age or older. The median age was 38 years. For every 100 females, there were 90.3 males. For every 100 females age 18 and over, there were 86.4 males.

The median income for a household in the city was $37,656, and the median income for a family was $47,083. Males had a median income of $30,139 versus $20,000 for females. The per capita income for the city was $14,505. About 2.0% of families and 4.5% of the population were below the poverty line, including 4.8% of those under age 18 and 5.6% of those age 65 or over.

See also
 Atchison County Community High School

References

Further reading

External links
 City of Effingham
 Effingham - Directory of Public Officials
 USD 377, local school district
 Effingham city map, KDOT

Cities in Kansas
Cities in Atchison County, Kansas
1868 establishments in Kansas
Populated places established in 1868